The 2021–22 Feldhockey-Bundesliga was the 79th season of the Men's Feldhockey Bundesliga, Germany's premier field hockey league.

The season started on 4 September and concluded on 5 June 2022 with the championship final. Rot-Weiss Köln are the defending champions. They defended their title by defeating Hamburger Polo Club 1–0 in the championship final.

Teams

A total of 12 teams participate in the 2021–22 edition of the Bundesliga. The promoted teams are Frankfurt 1880 and Düsseldorfer HC who replaced Crefelder HTC and Grossflottbeker THGC.

Number of teams by state

Regular season

Standings

Pool A

Pool B

Results

Top goalscorers

Play-downs
The play-downs took place from 14 May to 4 June 2022 and were played in a best of five format.

Overview

|}

Matches

TSV Mannheim won series 3–0 and stayed in the Bundesliga while Nürnberger HTC were relegated to the 2. Bundesliga..

Düsseldorfer HC won series 3–2 and stayed in the Bundesliga while Frankfurt 1880 were relegated to the 2. Bundesliga..

Play-offs
The quarter-finals were played in a best of three format with the first match hosted by the weaker-placed team on 14 or 15 May and the return match and potential third decisive match hosted by the better placed team on 28 and 29 May respectively. The semi-finals and final were hosted by Bonner THV in Bonn, North Rhine-Westphalia on 4 and 5 June 2022.

Bracket

Quarter-finals

Mannheimer HC won series 2–0.

Rot-Weiss Köln won series 2–0.

Harvestehuder THC won series 2–1.

Hamburger Polo Club won series 2–1.

Semi-finals

Third place match

Final

References

External links

Feldhockey Bundesliga (Men's field hockey)
Bundesliga
Feldhockey-Bundesliga 2021-22
Feldhockey-Bundesliga 2021-22